Honeymoon Island State Park is a Florida State Park located on Honeymoon Island, a barrier island across St. Joseph's Sound from Palm Harbor, Ozona, and Crystal Beach. It lies at the western end of Causeway Boulevard, which becomes Curlew Road east of Alternate US 19. Its address is 1 Causeway Blvd. Consistently receiving more than one million visitors each year, it is the most-visited state park in Florida.

History
Honeymoon and neighboring Caladesi Island were originally part of a large barrier island that split in half during a major hurricane in 1921. The waterway between the islands is known as Hurricane Pass.

According to the Florida Park Service, Honeymoon Island was introduced to the American public in the early 1940s through newsreels and magazines. The advertisements promised undiscovered pleasures for newlyweds. According to the Dunedin Museum (located in Dunedin, Florida on the mainland which lays claim to both Honeymoon Island and Caladesi Island), Honeymoon Island was formerly known as Hog Island. In the early 1940s, honeymoon-type huts were built on the island for vacationing, and the name was changed. After the US entered World War II, the thatched huts fell into disuse. The structures were soon worn down by the elements. The 1960s brought a developer with a plan to build a large residential area on the island by expanding the island to 3,000 acres. A causeway leading to the island was constructed in 1964. However, this plan was scrapped in 1969, when the developer's permit expired and the state prevented them from renewing it. The state purchased most of the island in 1974, then purchased the rest soon after. On December 7, 1981, Honeymoon Island State Park was created.

One of the island's services, a ferry to Caladesi Island, is only for convenience to those in the Honeymoon Island area to reach Caladesi Island across Hurricane Pass.  Caladesi Island is easily accessible by walking from Clearwater Beach, Florida, as it has been for decades, and it is only separated by a "welcome sign" from the south.

Biology
The barrier island park is a refuge for a number of species of plants and animals including Florida slash pines, mangroves, and several threatened and endangered species. Osprey and various species of tern, plover, herons, and wading birds reside on the island or stop during spring and fall migration. Dolphin pods are often sighted within yards of the shore. Starfish and other marine invertebrates are commonly found on the beach.

In the autumn of 2008, a pair of bald eagles made a nest on Osprey Trail in the park. 

Mosquitoes and Rattlesnakes are common to Honeymoon Island.

Recreational activities
Activities include birding, fishing, hiking and sunbathing. Amenities include picnic pavilions, bathhouses, a park concession, nature trails, bird observation areas, a beach for pets, and a passenger ferry to Caladesi Island State Park. The Rotary Centennial Nature Center features exhibits about the natural and cultural history of Honeymoon and Caladesi Islands and an elevated observation deck.

The Osprey Trail (2 miles long) and the Pelican Cove Trail (3/4 miles long) circle the forested, eastern side of the island. On these trails you can find palmetto trees, an eagle nest, slash pine, and on the Pelican Cove Trail, some sea life and wading birds.

Construction has been finished in portions of the beach near the north concession area to mitigate extensive erosion which has taken place over the years.

The beaches range from sandy to covered in large chunks of fossilized coral. Some areas may have water puddles that emit a stench during certain months, but this does not deter swimmers from using the beaches.

10 miles off the coast is the veterans memorial Circle of Heroes.

Hours, entrance fees, concessions
Florida state parks are open between 8 a.m. and sundown every day of the year (including holidays). While signage at the entrance to the park indicates a per-vehicle daily entrance fee of $8, single persons are only charged $4, as of February 2015.  There is also an annual pass for those who wish to save on frequent visits. The charge to ride the ferry to Caladesi Island is $14 per adult in addition to the park entrance fee. Honeymoon Island has two different concession areas: Café Honeymoon and the South Beach Pavilion.

Gallery

References

External links
Honeymoon Island State Park at Florida State Parks
Guide to Honeymoon Island at Tampa Bay Times

State parks of Florida
Parks in Pinellas County, Florida
Tourist attractions in the Tampa Bay area
Nature centers in Florida
Dunedin, Florida